Lagonegro is a town and comune in the province of Potenza, in the Southern Italian region of Basilicata. It is part of the Valle del Noce and has (2017) a population of 5,471.

Geography
The municipality, located southwest of its province, near the borders of Basilicata with Cilento, a subregion of Campania, is bordered by the municipalities of Casalbuono, Casaletto Spartano, Lauria, Moliterno, Montesano sulla Marcellana, Nemoli, Rivello and Tortorella. It counts the hamlets (frazioni) of Casale Serino, Cervaro, Farno, Fecìla, Fortino, Malpignata, Pennarone and Strette.

Transport
The town is served by two exits ("Lagonegro Nord" and "Lagonegro Sud") of the A2 motorway, linking Naples and Salerno to Cosenza, Lamezia and Reggio Calabria. Its railway station is the terminus of 2 abandoned lines using two different gauges: the standard gauge line Sicignano–Lagonegro, and the narrow gauge line Lagonegro–Castrovillari–Spezzano Albanese.

People
Tiziana Alagia (b. 1973), long distance runner
Giuseppe Mango (1954-2014), singer

See also
Lagonegro Cathedral

References

External links

Official website

 
Cities and towns in Basilicata